The Moscow Urban Forum (MUF) is an international forum about urbanization issues held in Moscow annually under the auspices of the Government of Moscow. The first MUF was held in 7-9 December 2011, the second took place 4-5 December 2012, and the third in 5-6 December 2013. MUF serves as a platform for open dialogue among representatives of the government, the managers of architectural and urban planning organizations, the real estate industry, the citizens of Moscow and leading foreign and Russian experts on urban planning. The Urban Land Institute is the international partner of MUF.

External links 
 Moscow Urban Forum - official website
 Moscow Urban Forum in Urban Land Institute site

Politics of Moscow
Organizations based in Moscow
Urban planning